Bob Weber, Sr. (June 26, 1934 – October 17, 2020), was an American cartoonist, best known for his Moose and Molly comic strip, distributed by King Features Syndicate.

Early life
Weber was born and raised in South Baltimore.

He attended the School of Visual Arts in New York City in 1953.

Career
Weber's career as a cartoonist and illustrator moved into high gear in 1959, when he contributed to The Saturday Evening Post and the syndicated Laff-a-Day panels.

Relocating to Connecticut, he became cartoonist Dick Cavalli's assistant on Winthrop. In 1965, he launched his own strip, which began September 20, 1965, as Moose, retitled Moose Miller six years later. It was renamed Moose and Molly (aka Moose & Molly) in 1998. After peaking with 200 newspapers, it eventually dropped to 75 papers.

Weber lived in Westport, Connecticut, which he referred to as "Westpork".

Weber's son, cartoonist Bob Weber, Jr., reaches a readership of 30 million with his Slylock Fox & Comics for Kids puzzle feature. He also co-created the short-lived Oh, Brother! strip.

References

External links

Jacquie Roland

1943 births
2020 deaths
American comic strip cartoonists
Artists from Baltimore
People from Westport, Connecticut
School of Visual Arts alumni